9 KK Road is a 2010 Malayalam mystery film directed by Simon Kuruvila under the banner of Sun Pictures. The film features Babu Antony, Vijayaraghavan and Nishanth Sagar in the lead roles. Several major political leaders from Kerala make special appearances in the film.

Plot
A regular mystery tale, the story begins with the discovery of four dead bodies in a deserted quarry. The Chief Minister involves into the case and appoints the IPS officer Devdas to investigate. Initially, Devdas is accompanied by one aide but that person walks out giving some excuses. Then Devdas is joined by Noushad and the duo gets brisk in their investigation. Devdas is one man who is known to get into the cracks of any issue until justice is got. Whether he is successful in his mission or not forms the rest of the story.

Cast 
 Babu Antony as Devdas Adiyodi
 C. K. Padmanabhan as Chief Minister.C.K.Padmanabhan
 P. C. George as P.C.George Opposition Leader
 T. N. Prathapan as Prathapan
 M. K. Muneer
 V.N. Vasavan as V.N Vasavan
 Vijayaraghavan as Mathayi/Fa.James
 Shammi Thilakan as Noushad
 Suvarna Mathew as Mollykutty
 Mala Aravindan as S.I. Mathukkutty
 Nishanth Sagar as Unnikrishnan
 Sadiq as Mukundan Menon
 Abu Salim as Iykkara Warkki
 Shamna Kasim as Rose Mary
 Kulappulli Leela
 Ayyappa Baiju
 Prashant

References

External links
 http://movies.sulekha.com/malayalam/9-kk-road/default.htm
 https://web.archive.org/web/20090606021058/http://popcorn.oneindia.in/title/1425/9-kk-road.html

2010 films
2010s Malayalam-language films